Chris Gerolmo is a Golden Globe nominated screenwriter, director, and singer-songwriter best known for writing the screenplay for the multi-Academy Award nominated film Mississippi Burning and the less successful Miles from Home starring Richard Gere.

He has also written a book about the death of his wife, Joan, from cancer in 2007. This is titled Death for Beginners, published by Patcheny Press in 2011. He lives in Brentwood, California with his three children and stepson.

Early life and education
He was born to Frank Gero (1929–2014), a former theater actor and stage manager who later became a producer, and Woji Gero who worked alongside her husband in the production business in the mid-1950s. He attended Harvard University in the early 1970s graduating with a BA in Writing & Film-making.

Television work
In 1995 Gerolmo wrote and directed the acclaimed made-for-TV movie Citizen X, about the russian serial killer Andrei Chikatilo. Gerolmo's screenplay for Citizen X — based on the book The Killer Department by Robert Cullen – earned him an Emmy nomination, a Writers Guild of America Award, and an Edgar Award.

He also co-created with Steven Bochco the FX Networks military drama series Over There. He also wrote and performed the title song.

He was a consulting producer on The Bridge, an American police drama on the FX network, based on a 2011 police drama series co-produced in Denmark and Sweden.

Filmography

Above Suspicion (2019) (writer)
The Bridge (2013) (TV Series) (producer: 12 episodes, writer: 1 episode)
Certain Prey (2011) (TV Movie) (teleplay) 
Over There (2005) (TV Series) co-creator, writer: 2 episodes
Citizen X (1995) (TV Movie) (teleplay)
The Witness (1992) (TV Short) 
Mississippi Burning (1988) (writer) 
Miles from Home (1988) (writer)

References

External links

Death For Beginners Kindle Edition
Huffington Post Opinion Piece on Mississippi Burning
Frank Gero, Broadway Producer, Dies at 84

American male screenwriters
American film directors
American male singer-songwriters
American singer-songwriters
American television producers
Place of birth missing (living people)
Edgar Award winners
German-language film directors
Writers Guild of America Award winners
Year of birth missing (living people)
Living people
Harvard University alumni